Heterozius rotundifrons, or big hand crab, is a species of crab of the family Belliidae, endemic to New Zealand.

Behavior 
When threatened, Heterozius rotundifrons has a unique antipredator behavior where it fully extends all its limbs including its chelipeds and becomes immobile. The crab keeps defensive stance for up to a few minutes.

References
 Miller M & Batt G, Reef and Beach Life of New Zealand, William Collins (New Zealand) Ltd, Auckland, New Zealand 1973
Bach, Catherine; Hazlett, Brian (2010). "Individuality in the predator defense behaviour of the crab Heterozius rotundifrons". Behaviour. 147 (5–6): 587–597. doi:10.1163/000579510x12629536366329. ISSN 0005-7959.
Hazlett, Brian A.; Mclay, Colin (2005-04). "Responses to predation risk: alternative strategies in the crab Heterozius rotundifrons". Animal Behaviour. 69 (4): 967–972. doi:10.1016/j.anbehav.2004.06.028. ISSN 0003-3472.

Crabs
Marine crustaceans of New Zealand
Monotypic arthropod genera